The Parable of the Lost Coin is one of the parables of Jesus. In it, a woman searches for a lost coin, finds it, and rejoices. It is a member of a trilogy on redemption that Jesus tells after the Pharisees and religious leaders accuse Him of welcoming and eating with "sinners." The other two are the Parable of the Lost Sheep, and the Parable of the Lost Son or Prodigal Son.

Narrative 

As recounted in Luke 15, a woman with ten silver coins (Greek drachmae) loses one.  She then lights an oil lamp and sweeps her house until she finds it, rejoicing when she does:

Interpretation 

Joel B. Green notes that "the woman described is a poor peasant", and the ten silver coins, corresponding to ten days' wages, "likely represent the family savings". The coins may also have been the woman's dowry, worn as an ornament. Both theories may be true, and either one explains the urgency of the woman's search, and the extent of her joy when the missing coin is found.

Green suggests that the invitation to the "friends and neighbors" may reflect a celebratory meal, which recalls the meals Jesus is accused of sharing with "sinners." The woman's diligent activity in searching may symbolise either Jesus' own activity or that of God the Father. The rejoicing of the angels is understood to be rejoicing along with God.

St. Gregory (Homily 34), explains the parable (reading swept as overturned), writing: “He who is signified by the shepherd, is signified also by the woman. For it is God Himself—God and the wisdom of God. And because there is an image impressed on the piece, the woman lost the piece of silver when man, who was created after the image of God, by sinning fell away from the likeness of his Creator. The woman lighted a candle, because the wisdom of God appeared in man. For the candle is a light in an earthen vessel, but the light in an earthen vessel is the Godhead in the flesh, and when the candle was lit she overturned (evertit) the house. Because as soon as His divinity shone forth through the flesh, all our consciences were appalled.... Because the corrupt mind, if it be not first overthrown through fear is not cleansed from its habitual faults. But when the house is overturned the piece of silver is found, for when the conscience of man is disturbed, the likeness of the Creator is restored in him."

Depictions 

This parable has been depicted by several artists, including John Everett Millais, Jan Luyken, Domenico Fetti, and James Tissot.

See also
 Life of Jesus in the New Testament
 Ministry of Jesus
 Parable of the Lost Sheep

References

External links
Biblical Art on the WWW: The Lost Coin

Lost Coin, Parable of the
Gospel of Luke
Women in the New Testament